Dragoun is a surname. Notable people with the surname include:

 František Roman Dragoun (1916–2005), Czech portrait painter
 Michal Dragoun (born 1983), Czech professional ice hockey player
 Roman Dragoun (born 1956), Czech singer, songwriter and keyboardist

Czech-language surnames